Kolouei O'Brien (1939 – 11 May 2015) was a politician from Tokelau and faipule of Fakaofo. He served as the head of government of Tokelau three times, from February 2000 until February 2001, from February 2003 until February 2004, and from February 2006 until February 2007. Kolouei O'Brien had a master's degree in navigation/yachting. He was born at Fakaofo and died at his home there on 11 May 2015.

References

1939 births
2015 deaths
Heads of Government of Tokelau
Government ministers of Tokelau
Members of the Parliament of Tokelau
People from Fakaofo